Greg Bell or Gregory Bell may refer to:

Greg Bell (athlete) (born 1930), American track and field Olympic athlete
Greg Bell (running back, born 1962), American football running back
Greg Bell (running back, born 1998), American football running back
Greg Bell (politician) (born 1948), American politician; Lieutenant Governor of Utah
Greg Bell (Australian footballer) (born 1955), Australian rules footballer